Setse(Burmese: စက်စဲကမ်းခြေ) is a beach resort on the Gulf of Martaban of the Andaman Sea in Thanbyuzayat Township, of Mon State, in southern Myanmar. Setse has been a resort since the 19th century, and still remains popular.

Mawlamyaing University has its Marine Science Laboratory in Setse, which studies commercial uses of algae (seaweed), cultured pearl techniques, and produces commercial agar-agar. Agar jellies are commonly used in traditional Myanmar desserts and other Asian culinary.

Notes

External links
"Setse Map – Satellite Images of Setse" Maplandia World Gazetteer

Populated places in Mon State
Beaches of Myanmar